Attulus eskovi is a jumping spider species in the family Salticidae that was first described in 1995.

Etymology
The species is named after Kirill Eskov, who collected most of the type material and information on its habitat.

Distribution
The holotype was found in the Kurile Islands and the species is known from Primorsky Krai in the Russian Far East and Sakhalin. Logunov & Wesołowska speculate that it is probable that it also occurs in Japan and Korea.

References

Sitticini
Spiders described in 1995
Spiders of Russia